Vrablic is a surname.  Notable people with the surname include:

 Igor Vrablic (born 1965), Canadian former soccer player
 Rosemary Vrablic (born 1960/61), American banker